Bucks County Community College (Bucks) is a public community college in Bucks County, Pennsylvania.  Founded in 1964, Bucks has three campuses and online courses: a main campus in Newtown, an "Upper Bucks" campus in the town of Perkasie, and a "Lower Bucks" campus in the town of Bristol. There are also various satellite facilities located throughout the county. The college offers courses via face-to-face classroom-based instruction, eLearning classes offered completely online (often referred to as distance learning), and in hybrid (blended) modes that combine face-to-face instruction with online learning. The college is accredited by the Middle States Commission on Higher Education.

History

The main Newtown campus is located on a former estate that Bucks County acquired in very early 1965 from Temple University, which had inherited it from Stella Elkins Tyler, a wealthy benefactor, only two years before.  The George F. Tyler Mansion houses administrative offices.  It was added to the National Register of Historic Places in 1987.

Locations 

Bucks has three campuses and also offers online classes.

Newtown 
Newtown Campus is the oldest and largest campus, and is located at 275 Swamp Road in Newtown, Pennsylvania – directly adjacent to Tyler State Park.

Facilities include: library, computer labs, science labs, teleconference center, art studios and workshops, TV studios, auditorium, early learning center, fitness center, gymnasium, cafeteria, and café.

Zlock Performing Arts Center 

In October 2014, the Gateway Auditorium would be renamed in honor of local philanthropists Kevin and Sima Zlock.

Upper Bucks 
The Upper Bucks Campus in Perkasie, Pennsylvania opened in 1999

Lower Bucks 
Established in 2007, the Gene & Marlene Epstein Campus at Lower Bucks is located in Bristol, Pennsylvania.

Academics 
Bucks offers over 90 academic programs within 7 Academic Departments, including 43 Associate's Degree programs designed to transfer to a four-year institution for the completion of a Bachelor's Degree. There are also 23 occupational Associate's Degree programs and 27 certificate programs, both designed to prepare students to directly enter the workforce in a variety of disciplines.

Academic Departments

Arts & Communication 
The Department of Arts & Communication offers programs of study in Fine Arts, Graphic Design, Multimedia, Cinema/Video, Communication, Photography, Furniture & Cabinetmaking, Web & Multimedia Design, and Music. The School of Music is accredited by both the National Association of Schools of Art and Design and the National Association of Schools of Music.

Business + Innovation 
The Department of Business + Innovation Department offers programs in Business Administration, Accounting & Analytics, Business, Chef Apprenticeship: Foods emphasis, Chef Apprenticeship: Pastry emphasis, Emergency Management, Fire Science, Hospitality Management, Meeting, Convention and Event Planning, Paralegal Studies, Technical Entrepreneurship, Accounting & Taxation. Baking and Pastry, Business Analytics, Culinary Arts, Emergency Management Certificate, Fire Prevention & Investigation, Fire Science, Meeting, Convention and Event Planning, Paralegal, Social Media and Digital Marketing. Business Administration, Business, Paralegal, and Account & Analytics programs accredited by the Accreditation Council for Business Schools and Programs (ACBSP).

Health Sciences 
The Department of Health Sciences Department offers programs in Health Science, Public Health, Nursing, Radiography, Magnetic Resonance Imaging, Medical Assisting, Diagnostic Medical Sonography, Health Information Technology, Medical Laboratory Technician, Computed Tomography, Medical Coding, Patient Care Technician, and Phlebotomy.

Kinesiology & Sport Studies 
The Department of Kinesiology and Sport Studies offers programs in Exercise Science, Health and Physical Education (teacher education), Sport Management, and Dance, as well as certificates in Health Coaching and Recreational Leadership.

Language & Literature 
The Department of Language & Literature offers programs in English, Global Studies/World Languages, Guided Studies, Journalism, and Liberal Arts.

The Department hosts the Wordsmiths Series, and is the home of the Tyler Literary Society's Literary magazine now in its 31st year.

Science, Technology, Engineering, and Mathematics 
The Department of Science, Technology, Engineering, and Mathematics (STEM) offers programs in Biology, Biomedical Sciences, Chemistry, Computer Science, Cybersecurity, Data Science, Information Science, Engineering, Environmental Science, Individual Transfer Studies, Mathematics, Neuroscience, Science, Secondary Education: Mathematics, Biotechnology, Brewing & Fermentation Science, Computer Networking Technology, Engineering Technology, Information Technology Studies, Biotechnology, Computer Networking Technology, and Computer Hardware Installation and Maintenance.

Social & Behavioral Sciences 
The Department of Social & Behavioral Sciences offers programs in Criminal Justice, Economics, Education, Geography, History, Historic Preservation, Humanities, Philosophy, Political Science, Psychology, Sociology, and Social Work.

Transfer Agreements 
Students can take advantage of transfer agreements with four-year institutions to complete their Bachelor's Degree, including 27 Transfer Intent (Dual Enrollment) agreements with the following schools:

Albright College, Arcadia University, Bloomsburg University, Cabrini University, Cedar Crest College, Chestnut Hill College, Delaware Valley University, Eastern University, East Stroudsburg University, Gwynedd-Mercy University, Holy Family University, Immaculata University, Kutztown University, LaSalle University, Neumann University, Peirce College, Penn State Abington, Penn College of Art and Design, Rider University, Rosemont College, Saint Joseph's University, Temple University, and University of the Sciences.

Continuing Education 
The Continuing Education Department offers classes for Personal Enrichment and Professional Development.

IT Academy 
The IT Academy at Bucks County Community College offers training for technology certification programs, as well as other technology courses. Certifications include CompTIA, Cisco Certified Networking Associate (CCNA), Certified Information Systems Security Professional (CISSP), Amazon Web Services (aws), and more.

Center for Workforce Development 
The Center for Workforce Development offers Career and Workforce Training, some of which is in partnership with PA CareerLink and the County of Bucks. A new Center for Advanced Manufacturing began construction in the Spring of 2021 at the Lower Bucks Campus.

Fire & Public Safety 
Department of Public and Industrial Safety Training & Certification offers training and accredited certifications in public safety operation and management, emergency management, Occupational Safety and Health Administration (OSHA) industrial safety, and hazmat procedure. They also host Fire Training Weekends for Pennsylvania fire departments.

Alumni 
Some notable graduates include Steve Capus, Anthony Fedorov, Patrick Murphy and Terri Schiavo.

References

External links

Community colleges in Pennsylvania
Educational institutions established in 1964
Universities and colleges in Bucks County, Pennsylvania
1964 establishments in Pennsylvania
Two-year colleges in the United States